The Southern Conference women's basketball tournament has been played every year since the 1983–1984 academic year.  The winner of the tournament is guaranteed an automatic berth into the NCAA Women's Division I Basketball Championship.

Chattanooga leads the conference in wins, with 18 in 32 tournaments and five consecutively from 2013 until 2017.

Results

Champions

 East Tennessee State and Wofford have not yet won a SoCon tournament.
 Charleston (SC), Davidson, and Elon never won the tournament as SoCon members.
 Schools highlighted in pink are former members of the SoCon

See also
 List of Southern Conference men's basketball champions

References